Thioredoxin reductases (TR, TrxR) are enzymes that reduce thioredoxin (Trx). Two classes of thioredoxin reductase have been identified: one class in bacteria and some eukaryotes and one in animals. In bacteria TrxR also catalyzes the reduction of glutaredoxin like proteins known as NrdH. Both classes are flavoproteins which function as homodimers.  Each monomer contains a FAD prosthetic group, a NADPH binding domain, and an active site containing a redox-active disulfide bond.

Cellular role 
Thioredoxin reductases are enzymes that catalyze the reduction of thioredoxin and hence they are a central component in the thioredoxin system. Together with thioredoxin (Trx) and NADPH this system's most general description is as a system for reducing disulfide bonds in cells. Electrons are taken from NADPH via TrxR and are transferred to the active site of Trx, which goes on to reduce protein disulfides or other substrates. The Trx system exists in all living cells and has an evolutionary history tied to DNA as a genetic material, defense against oxidative damage due to oxygen metabolism, and redox signaling using molecules like hydrogen peroxide and nitric oxide.

Diversity 
Two classes of thioredoxin reductase have evolved independently:
 A high molecular weight (MW = ~55,000) type containing a selenocysteine residue in its active site has been identified in higher eukaryotes including humans. This TxR is related to glutathione reductase, trypanothione reductase, mercuric reductase and lipoamide dehydrogenase.
 A low molecular weight (MW = ~ 35,000) type has been identified in archaea, bacteria and other eukarya.
These two classes of TrxR have only ~20% sequence identity in the section of primary sequence where they can be reliably aligned.  The net reaction of both classes of TrxR is identical but the mechanism of action of each is distinct.

Humans express three thioredoxin reductase isozymes: thioredoxin reductase 1 (TrxR1, cytosolic), thioredoxin reductase 2 (TrxR2, mitochondrial), thioredoxin reductase 3 (TrxR3, testis specific).  Each isozyme is encoded by a separate gene:

Structure

E. coli 
In E. coli ThxR there are two binding domains, one for FAD and another for NADPH. The connection between these two domains is a two-stranded anti-parallel β-sheet.  Each domain individually is very similar to the analogous domains in glutathione reductase, and lipoamide dehydrogenase but they relative orientation of these domains in ThxR is rotated by 66 degrees. This becomes significant in the enzyme mechanism of action which is described below.
ThxR homo-dimerizes with the interface between the two monomers formed by three alpha-helices and two loops. Each monomer can separately bind a molecule of thioredoxin.

Mammalian 
Mammalian TrxR structure is similar to E. coli. It contains a FAD and NADPH binding domain, and an interface between two monomer subunits. In mammalian ThxR there is an insertion in the FAD binding domain between two alpha helices which forms a small pair of beta strands. The active disulfide in the enzyme is located on one of these helices and thus the active disulfide bond is located in the FAD domain and not the NADPH domain as in E. coli and other prokaryotes.

Mechanism

E. coli 
In E. coli ThxR the spatial orientation of the FAD and NADPH domains are such that the redox-active rings of FAD and NADPH are not in close proximity to each other. When the FAD domain of E. coli is rotated 66 degrees with the NADPH domain remaining fixed the two prosthetic groups move into close contact allowing electrons to pass from NADPH to FAD and then to the active site disulfide bond.  The conserved active site residues in E. coli are -Cys-Ala-Thr-Cys-.

Mammalian 
Mammalian TrxRs have a much higher sequence homology with glutathione reductase than E. coli. The active-site Cys residues in the FAD domain and bound NADPH domain are in close proximity removing the necessity for a 66 degree rotation for electron transfer found in E. coli. An additional feature of the mammalian mechanism is the presence of a selenocysteine residue at the C-terminal end of the protein which is required for catalytic activity. The conserved residues in mammalian active site are -Cys-Val-Asn-Val-Gly-Cys-.

Detection methods 
Thioredoxin reductase can be quantified by various methods such as the DTNB assay using Ellman's reagent. The disulfide-based TRFS series of fluorescent probes have shown selective detection of TrxR.  Mafireyi synthesized the first diselenide probe that was applied in the detection of TrxR.  Other detection methods include immunological techniques and the selenocystine-thioredoxin reductase assay (SC-TR assay).

Clinical significance

Cancer treatment 
Since the activity of this enzyme is essential for cell growth and survival, it is a good target for anti-tumor therapy. Furthermore, the enzyme is  upregulated in several types of cancer, including malignant mesothelioma. For example, motexafin gadolinium (MGd) is a new chemotherapeutic agent that selectively targets tumor cells, leading to cell death and apoptosis via  inhibition of thioredoxin reductase and ribonucleotide reductase.

Cardiomyopathy 
Dilated cardiomyopathy (DCM) is a common diagnosis in cases of congestive heart failure. Thioredoxin reductases are essential proteins for regulating cellular redox balance and mitigating the damage caused by reactive oxygen species generated via oxidative phosphorylation in the mitochondria. Inactivation of mitochondrial TrxR2 in mice results in thinning of the ventricular heart walls and neonatal death. Furthermore two mutations in the TrxR2 gene are found in patients diagnosed with DCM and not in a control population. It is hypothesized that the pathological impact of these mutations is an impaired ability to control oxidative damage in cardiac myocytes.

Antibiotic 
There has recently been some research to show that low molecular weight thioredoxin reductase could be a target for novel antibiotics (such as auranofin or Ebselen.) This is especially true for Mycobacterium Haemophilum, and could be used for antibiotic resistant bacteria.

References

External links 
 

EC 1.8.1